Karl Byrom (born 26 July 1951) is an Australian former swimmer. He competed in five events at the 1968 Summer Olympics.

References

External links
 

1951 births
Living people
Australian male backstroke swimmers
Australian male medley swimmers
Olympic swimmers of Australia
Swimmers at the 1968 Summer Olympics
Commonwealth Games medallists in swimming
Commonwealth Games bronze medallists for Australia
Swimmers at the 1966 British Empire and Commonwealth Games
Swimmers from Sydney
20th-century Australian people
Medallists at the 1966 British Empire and Commonwealth Games